Isingiro District is a district in the Western Region of Uganda. The town of Isingiro is the district's main municipal, administrative, and commercial center.

Location
Isingiro District is bordered by Kiruhura District to the north, Rakai District to the east, Tanzania to the south, Ntungamo District to the west, and Mbarara District to the north-west.

Population
The 2014 national housing and population census estimated the population of Isingiro District at 486,360.
In 2002, the population was recorded at approximately 316,000, while the 1991 national population census estimated the population at 226,400.

Prominent people
Prominent people from the district include:
 Gordon Wavamunno, an entrepreneur, businessman, and philanthropist. He is reported to be one of the wealthiest people in Uganda and is the chancellor of Nkumba University.
 Benon Biraaro, was a retired military officer, entrepreneur, and aspiring politician. (deceased)
 Bright Rwamirama, a retired military officer and politician. State Minister for Animal Industry in the Ugandan Cabinet. Also serves as the elected member of parliament representing Isingiro County North in Isingiro District.
Nathan Byanyima,  is the current Chairperson CoST Uganda MSG. He is newly elected Member of Parliament for Bukanga County, and the Director Uganda Bus Operators

See also
 Districts of Uganda

References

External links
 Isingiro District Head Office Works Begin
  Isingiro Leaders Protest NEMA Evictions from Lakeside
 Uganda district Information handbook. expanded edition 2011-2012. pg.269

 
Ankole sub-region
Districts of Uganda
Western Region, Uganda